= Gidu railway station =

Railway station in Pakistan

Coordinates: 25.3787°N 68.3177°E

General information
- Owner: Ministry of Railways

Other information
- Station code: GAB

History
- Former names: Great Indian Peninsula Railway
Location

Gidu railway station (Urdu: گڈو ریلوے اسٹیشن) is located in Pakistan.

== See also ==
- List of railway stations in Pakistan
- Pakistan Railways
